"Norway" is a song by American dream pop band Beach House, from their third studio album, Teen Dream. The song was released on January 18, 2010, with "Baby" as its B-side. The song was released as a free download on the band's site on November 17, 2009, before its commercial release.

Critical reception
"Norway" received very positive reviews from contemporary music critics. The song was chosen upon release as Pitchfork Media's "Best New Track". Aaron Leitko stated that, "'Norway', the lead track from Teen Dream, the duo's Sub Pop debut, raises the temperature a few degrees. A percussive intro yields to an explosion of twinkling guitars and a chorus of woozy backing vocals. The core elements of Beach House's sound-- the drum machine, the thrift store keyboards-- are still present; they're just a few ticks faster. This makes a big difference. As it turns out, Beach House goes from dour to exuberant in just a few BPM." Leitko continues by saying, "Legrand, whose vocals have been saddled with Nico comparisons, can finally breathe a sigh of relief, too. The 1960s chanteuse's shadow is nowhere to be found here. 'You let us in the wooden house/ To share in all the wealth,' sings Legrand over a carsick slide guitar riff. No, 'Norway' is radiant with the sunshiny 70s pop vibes. It's Stevie Nicks territory, for sure. Climate change has come to Beach House, and the weather suits them beautifully."

Track listing

Charts

References

External links
 

2010 singles
2009 songs
Sub Pop singles
Beach House songs
Songs written by Victoria Legrand